All That She Wants: The Classic Collection is a commemorative box set by the Swedish pop group Ace of Base. The set was released under the label Edsel by the Demon Music Group on 3 July 2020 in the UK. The release coincides with the band's 30th anniversary.

Background 
The set was released as an 11-CD+DVD set and 4-LP coloured vinyl compilation. The CD/DVD set includes expanded versions of the group's original four studio albums and the 2015 compilation album Hidden Gems, Hidden Gems, Vol. 2 – a new follow-up to the original Hidden Gems –, a new EP, and a DVD with all music videos and bonus material; the LP set only includes the studio albums reissued on 180 gram vinyl. The CDs contain previously unreleased material, including live recordings of the group's first live performance in their hometown of Gothenburg in 1990. It also includes remixes of the shelved 1996 single, "Edge of Heaven". The liner notes were compiled by U.S. journalist and music critic Fred Bronson. Hidden Gems, Vol. 2 was sent to streaming platforms 28 August 2020.

Critical reception
In the UK, Duncan Seaman of Classic Pop magazine called the album "lavish", stating that the band's legacy would be cemented with the box set.

The Second Disc said in their review: "If you only know them from their biggest hits like The Sign and Don't Turn Around, there is a lot of worthwhile exploration in this box between the audio, video and expansive liner notes from Billboard's Fred Bronson which should be the final word on this era of group."

Commercial performance
The album entered the UK's official charts, at #79 on Physical Album Sales and #98 on Album Sales.

Track listing

Release history

References

External links 
 

Ace of Base compilation albums
Ace of Base video albums
2020 compilation albums
2020 remix albums
2020 video albums
Music video compilation albums